Bihar Police Academy is the civil service institute for training of Bihar Police Service Officers and Bihar Police in the state of Bihar. The academy's new campus is located in Rajgir.

The academy is the state civil service training institution for Bihar Police Service Officers  and Bihar Police in  the state of Bihar. The institute provides training to new police recruits and current  police  employees  in the ranks of Deputy Superintendent of Police/Assistant Commandant/Assistant Commissioner of Police and above ranks  of Bihar Police Service and also to ranks below it such as   Inspector of Police  ,  Sub Inspector of Police, Assistant Sub Inspector of Police, Head Constable and Constable  under Bihar Police. It also provides training in various fields to serving state police officers.

Mission 
The Goal of the Bihar Police Academy is to prepare leaders for the Bihar Police, who will lead / command the service with courage, uprightness, dedication and a strong sense of service to the people.

The Academy will endeavour to inculcate in them, all such values and norms as would help them to serve the people honestly and impartially with zeal and dedication. It will try to inculcate integrity of the highest order, sensitivity to aspirations of people in a fast changing social and economic milieu, respect for human rights, broad liberal perspective of law and justice, high standard of professionalism, physical fitness and mental alertness.

The Academy will be a centre for research studies on police subjects and will expand its resource base through tie-ups with similar institutions in and outside the country.

Vision 
Bihar Police is committed to achieve the highest standards of professional competence, adapting to changes both foreseen and unforeseen, using Science and Technology and synergizing its vast human potential to the optimum. Transparency in working and accountability to the people and the Constitution is paramount goal of academy. Upholding the belief in constitution, inalienable Human Rights of the individual and Rule of Law shall be top priority of academy.

Bihar Police will achieve the following by training officers in:

Prevention and Detection of Crime by systematic, scientific, meticulous and rigorous investigation. Maintaining public peace and law and order by being fair and impartial. Encouraging Police –public cooperation by initiating Community policing initiatives. Combating Extremist and Anti National activities with firmness interspersed with attempts to win the hearts and minds of the militants. Creating a Work environment and work ethic which focuses on team building, multilateral communication and mutual trust. Developing a spirit of humanism, reform and compassion for the poorest of the poor. Evolving effective systems and updating existing procedures in collaboration with the Courts to firm up the Criminal Justice System. Striving for excellence in every aspect of its functioning to reach the pinnacles of achievement.

History

In undivided Bihar, the Police Academy was located in Hazaribagh imparting training to state police officers. On 15 November 2000, Hazaribagh became a part of Jharkhand. This left Bihar without a Police Academy and the officers were getting trained at Constable Training School at Nathnagar, Bhagalpur.

New campus

After loss of Police Academy to Jharkhand, Government of Bihar started the process to set up a new campus for Bihar Police Academy in Rajgir, Bihar. The academy was inaugurated on 3 December 2018 by chief minister shri Nitish Kumar. The budget for the new campus is Rs. 206 Crores and the area of the campus is 133 acres. The campus is being built as a Green building. The campus also includes an auditorium with the capacity to seat 1,500 and two huge parade grounds - one ceremonial and another for practice.

Training

The Bihar Police Academy trains officers of the Bihar Police, who have been selected through Examination conducted by Bihar Public Service Commission and Bihar Police Subordinate Services Commission. The trained officers are then posted in their respective ranks in various parts of the states under whom the other sub-ranks of police force work. The recruitment of sub-ranks such as constables and other subordinate positions are done by various commissions in the state. The academy has capacity to train 2,200 sub-inspector and 200 DSP-rank officers.

Organisation

The Academy is headed by a Director, an IPS officer of the rank of Additional Director General of Police (3-star rank).

See also

 Bihar Police
 Indian Police Service
 Sardar Vallabhbhai Patel National Police Academy
 Law enforcement in India
 Indian Police Foundation and Institute
 Bureau of Police Research and Development

References

Police academies in India
Bihar Police
Rajgir
2018 establishments in Bihar
Educational institutions established in 2018